A Love So Beautiful is a Chinese streaming television series starring Hu Yitian and Shen Yue, based on the novel To Our Pure Little Beauty by Zhao Qianqian. It aired on Tencent Video from 9 November until 7 December 2017.

The series was popular during its run, and received positive reviews for its characterization and story. It surpassed more than 10.5 billion views on its online streams.

Plot 
Chen Xiaoxi (Shen Yue) and Jiang Chen (Hu Yitian) are classmates at Chenxi Secondary School and have been neighbors since kindergarten. Chen Xiaoxi, a cheerful girl who doesn't study much, is expressive about her admiration towards Jiang Chen, a popular student known for his good looks and high grades. However, Jiang Chen is very distant and indifferent towards people because of his father's early death. Together with their friends—the funny yet dirty-minded Lu Yang, athletic but blunt Lin Jingxiao, and joyful national swimmer Wu Bosong—Chen Xiaoxi and Jiang Chen prepare for their  Gaokao, a university entrance examination, during their journey through secondary school and towards adulthood leading to the bloom of love in Jiang Chen towards Chen Xiaoxi, and eventually the two end up together.

Chen Xiaoxi and Jiang Chen are neighbors. She has a very passionate and expressive crush on Jiang Chen, who keeps rejecting all her expressions of affection. They have been studying together since kindergarten. Chen Xiaoxi makes a lot of effort in high school to get Jiang Chen's affection, like writing a love letter, preparing for his mother's visit, running for the class monitor, trying to acquire tickets for the Manchester United match, competing in a hurdle race, directing a play, and getting humiliated in front of the whole school due to the recording of the wrong recording played during their class's play. Jiang Chen also has feelings for Xiaoxi, but he doesn't show them. He helps her every time she lands in trouble. She is motivated by Lin Jingxiao, who supports her in all her efforts to grab Jiang Chen's attention. Lu Yang gets attracted to Jingxiao's bold attitude and harbors a crush on Jingxiao which she brushes off light-heartedly. Jingxiao begins to crush on the school Dr Li after he gives his shirt to her after her pant get torn when she jumps over the wall to meet her father who stays overseas. Wu Bosong starts to like Xiaoxi after she cheers for him in a swimming event even though he finishes second. He goes to great lengths to show his affection for her. Thus Jiang Chen and Wu Bosong always have tension in the air regarding Xiaoxi.

Jiang Chen gets jealous of Wu Bosong's closeness to Xiaoxi and rebuffs her at times when Wu Bosong comes to Xiaoxi's aid. On the day of the field trip, Xioaxi plans fireworks for Jiang Chen. But circumstances turn against her and she witnesses Li Wei embracing Jiang Chen. Jiang Chen tries to make up to a heartbroken Xiaoxi, but in vain. Li Wei cheats on an exam and gets caught. She is revealed to be diagnosed with depression. She steals diazepam from the school infirmary and tries to commit suicide. She is saved in the nick of time by Dr. Li and Jiang Chen. Dr. Li takes responsibility for the missing pills, leading to his suspension from the school. Jingxiao takes the blame to save Dr. Li making Lu Yang realize that Jingxiao likes Dr. Li. He starts to run on realizing this and falls unconscious due to his heart problems. He is saved by Dr. Li. Dr. Li leaves the school and Lu Yang publicly acknowledges his feelings for Jingxiao in the school assembly.

Lu Yang is hospitalized and refuses to meet Jingxiao. Wu Bosong gets injured and has to pull out of the national swimming championship. After an incident where Wu Bosong's grandmother gets lost due to her dementia and her praise for his swimming abilities, he decides to give up on Xiaoxi, leave school, and concentrate on swimming. Jiang Chen gets into a prestigious university in Beijing, but he decides to study medicine nearby as he doesn't want to leave behind Xiaoxi. Xiaoxi's college application gets rejected and she prepares for the art entrance exam. She passes and takes up an art major in the same university as Jiang Chen. Jiangxiao and Lu Yang start to date officially. Jiang Chen gets more expressive regarding his feelings for Xiaoxi.

When they near graduation, Lu Yang decides to get his heart surgery which is a success. Jiang Chen gets busier and has very little time to spend with Xiaoxi. Jiang Chen gets the opportunity to get advanced training in Beijing for 4 years. But he is reluctant to take it up and leave behind Xiaoxi. Xiaoxi decides to search for a home on her own, where she gets attacked by the agent. She runs to the hospital to meet Jiang Chen where she gets to know about Jiang Chen going to Beijing. Upset, Xiaoxi decides to break up with Jiang Chen. Jiang Chen, upset due to losing his first patient in the surgery, goes to meet Xiaoxi. She turns a cold shoulder to him. The next day, Jiang Chen misreads the situation of Lu Yang and his friend helping Xiaoxi moving out of the hostel and decides to go to Beijing.

After 3 years, Wu Bosong is a celebrity, Jingxiao is pursuing masters in astronomy, Lu Yang is a professional e-sports gamer, and Xiaoxi is a cartoonist. When Xiaoxi's father slips and breaks his spine and gets admitted to the hospital, she meets Jiang Chen again who has returned from Beijing. He is resolved to take Xiaoxi back. He brings a fake girlfriend to Jingxiao and Lu Yang's bachelor party and sells his car to get Xiaoxi's comic book published. Xiaoxi is torn between her feelings as Jiang Chen says he wants her back. Wu Bosong, insecure after the return of Jiang Chen, proposes to Xiaoxi, who refuses. Drunk, Wu Bosong gets Jiang Chen to confess his feelings towards Xiaoxi which she hears through the phone. Jiang Chen and Xiaoxi reconcile and got engaged. Xiaoxi's comic book, "A Love So Beautiful" based on her school life is a hit. The five friends meet together at Xiaoxi's book signing event and go out for a meal together. In the end, we get to hear Jiang Chen's perspective of the story, the way he used to have feelings for her and so on.

In the last episode, we are taken back to their school days where an upset Xiaoxi, wrongly accused of stealing a shopping voucher by her father runs away to participate in a singing competition. She is brought back home by Jiang Chen.

Cast

Main

Supporting

Soundtrack

Awards and nominations

Remake 
Kakao M announced on July 1, 2020 that they will remake the series under a short drama version. The company announced that they have started full-fledged preparations.

On July 27, 2020, the company announced that So Joo-yeon, Kim Yo-han, Yeo Hoe-hyun and Jo Hye-joo were cast for the lead roles. Produced by WhyNot Media, a short form drama with eponymous title having 24 episodes of 20 minutes each premiered on KakaoTV on 28 December 2020 and is available for streaming on Netflix.

References

External links 
 

2017 Chinese television series debuts
2017 Chinese television series endings
Chinese romantic comedy television series
Chinese high school television series
Chinese web series
Television shows based on Chinese novels
Tencent original programming
Television series by Huace Media
2017 web series debuts